Indian Institute of Information Technology, Lucknow (IIIT Lucknow or IIITL) is a technical university, one of the Indian Institute of Information Technology, in Lucknow that focuses on Information Technology. It was established by the Ministry of Education(formerly the Ministry of Human Resource Development), Government of India in partnership with the Government of Uttar Pradesh and Uttar Pradesh Electronics Corporation as industry partner. It is a not-for-profit institution established in the Public-Private Partnership (PPP) model.

IIIT Lucknow is located in IT City, Lucknow, Uttar Pradesh. For its first academic session 2015–16, classes started from mentor Indian Institute of Information Technology, Allahabad's campus.

It offers four courses in Bachelor of Technology(B.Tech.): Computer science, Information technology, Computer Science and Artificial intelligence, and Computer Science and Business; Master of Technology(M.Tech.) in Computer Science; Master of Business Administration(MBA) in Digital Business; and a Doctor of Philosophy(PhD) program.

Establishment
To address the challenges faced by the Indian IT industry and growth of the domestic IT market, the Ministry of Education, Government of India established twenty Indian Institutes of Information Technology (IIITs), on a Public Private Partnership (PPP) basis. The partners in setting up the IIITs are Ministry of Education, Governments of the respective States where each IIIT will be established, and industry partners.

IIITL was approved by the Government of India's Ministry of Education. IIITL has been set up on a public–private partnership (PPP) basis.

Academics
IIITL has an intake of 240 in the B.Tech. program - 60 candidates each in 
Computer Science (CS), 
Computer Science & Artificial Intelligence (CSAI)
Computer Science & Business (CSB), 
Information Technology (IT), as of 2021–22. M.Tech. program has an intake of 30 candidates. The admission in B.Tech. programmes is through the Joint Seat Allocation Authority (JoSAA). Post graduate students are admitted through Centralized Counselling For M.Tech. (CCMT).

IIITL houses the following departments:
 Department of Computer Science 
 Department of Information Technology
 Department of Mathematics
 Department of Management

IIITL has recently opened a research centre, i.e., Centre for Data Science and Artificial Intelligence (CDSAI).

References

NMIMS Chief Academic Officer appointed founding Director of IIIT Lucknow
IIIT Lucknow to launch two full-time management courses online
IIIT starts MBA in digital business
https://www.hindustantimes.com/education/iiit-lucknow-launches-new-course-on-pg-diploma-in-digital-marketing/story-1khFCQVqLTWSnxZB8ibrnK.html

External links
 

Lucknow
Universities and colleges in Lucknow
Deemed universities in India
Engineering colleges in Lucknow
Educational institutions established in 2015
2015 establishments in Uttar Pradesh